Steve Darcis was the defending champion but decided not to defend his title.
Top seed Adrian Mannarino won his 11th Challenger Tour title, beating Alejandro Falla 5–7, 6–2, 6–2

Seeds

Draw

Finals

Top half

Bottom half

References
 Main Draw
 Qualifying Draw

BNP Paribas de Nouvelle-Caledonie - Singles
Internationaux de Nouvelle-Calédonie